Francesco di Vannuccio (documented 1356–1389; died before 1391) was an Italian painter born in Siena.  A small body of work has been ascribed to this painter, characterized by an attention to and love of pattern and decoration, a tradition dating back in Siena to Simone Martini.  A signed and dated double-sided processional standard of 1380, painted on one side with the Crucifixion and on the other side with a painted glass depiction of the Virgin Enthroned with Saints, in the Gemäldegalerie, Berlin (inv. no. 1062B), has been the basis on which a number of other paintings have been attributed.  Most of these are small-scale works, richly finished, which were meant for private devotion, suggesting that Francesco di Vannuccio worked for a discerning and wealthy group of private patrons.

References

There is a painting by Sienese Italian Trecento Painter,Francesco Vannuccio in the Frick Art Museum in Pittsburgh("Saint Catherine")

External links
Italian Paintings: Sienese and Central Italian Schools, a collection catalog containing information about Vannuccio and his works (see index; plate 21).

14th-century Italian painters
Italian male painters
Painters from Siena
Trecento painters
Year of death unknown
1356 births
Gothic painters